Josep is a Catalan masculine given name equivalent to Joseph (Spanish José).

People named Josep include:

 Josep Bargalló (born 1958), Catalan philologist and former politician
 Josep Bartolí (1910-1995), Catalan painter, cartoonist and writer
 Josep (film), 2020 biopic film by Aurel detailing the life of Bartolí
 Josep Borrell (born 1947), Spanish politician
 Josep María Comadevall (born 1983), Spanish footballer commonly known as Pitu
 Josep or José Carreras (born 1946), Catalan tenor opera singer
 Josep Comas i Solà (1868-1937), Spanish Catalan astronomer
 Josep Figueras (born 1959), Catalan health policy expert
 Josep Gombau (born 1976), Spanish football manager
 Josep "Pep" Guardiola (born 1971), Catalan football manager and former player
 Josep Llorens i Artigas (1892–1980), Spanish ceramic artist
 Josep Maria Margall (born 1955), Spanish retired basketball player
 José Marín (racewalker) (born 1950) (Catalan: Josep Marín i Sospedra), Spanish retired race walker
 Josep Maria Mauri (born 1941), Catalan Catholic priest, personal representative of the episcopal Co-Prince of Andorra
 Josep Pagès (born 1972), Catalan politician
 Josep Piqué (born 1955), Spanish politician, Spain's foreign minister from 2000 to 2002
 Josep Lluís Sert (1902-1983), Spanish architect and city planner
 Josep Soler i Sardà (born 1935), Spanish composer, writer and music theorist
  (died 1934)

See also
 Joseph
 Josef (disambiguation)
 Jozef
 József
 Yosef (disambiguation)

Masculine given names
Catalan masculine given names